Burghart Klaußner (born 13 September 1949) is a German film actor.

Klaußner had engagements at Maxim Gorki Theater in Berlin, Hamburger Kammerspiele and at the theaters in Cologne, Hamburg, Zürich, Bremen and Bochum. In Hamburg 2006, Klaußner also made his debut as a theater director. He has appeared in more than 90 films and television shows since 1983. He has also narrated many audiobooks, including Ian McEwan's Solar, and several Ferdinand von Schirach novels.

Selected filmography

 Ziemlich weit weg (1983)
 Love Is the Beginning of All Terror (1984)
 Das Rätsel der Sandbank (1987, TV film) – Davies
 Europa, abends (1989) – Reisebüro-Angestellter
 The State Chancellery (1989, TV film) – Björn Engholm
  (1991, TV film) – Referent
 The Terrible Threesome (1991) – House Owner
 Child's Play (1992) – Father
 Schattenboxer (1992) – Maler
 Just a Matter of Duty (1993) – Werner Kraengel
 La lumière des étoiles mortes (1994) – Capitaine Krantz
 Ein falscher Schritt (1995) – Eugen Himmelreiter
  (1996) – Herr Leer
 The Superwife (1996) – Rudi Fährenberg
  (1997) – Tabatier
 23 (1998) – Weber
 Crazy (2000) – Klaus Lebert, Benjamins Vater
 Good Bye Lenin! (2003) – Alex' Vater
 Hamlet_X (2003) – Polonius
 The Edukators (2004) – Hardenberg
 Ein Goldfisch unter Haien (2004) – Rupert
 Requiem (2006) – Karl Klingler
 Der Mann von der Botschaft (2006) – Herbert Neumann
  (2007) – Prof. Udo Keller
 Yella (2007) – Dr. Gunthen
 The Reader (2008) – Judge
 Mediator (2008) – Mediator
  (2009) – Justus Lenz
 The White Ribbon (2009) – The Pastor
 The Silence (2010) – Krischan Mittich
  (2010)
 Young Goethe in Love (2010) – Lottes Vater
 Lessons of a Dream (2011) – Gustav Merfeld
 Invasion (2012) – Josef
 The Zigzag Kid (2012) – Felix
  (2013, TV miniseries) – Lorenz Adlon
 Night Train to Lisbon (2013) – Judge Prado
 Inbetween Worlds (2014) – Oberst Haar
 Diplomacy (2014) – Hauptmann Werner Ebernach
 13 Minutes (2015) – Arthur Nebe
 The People vs. Fritz Bauer (2015) – Fritz Bauer
 Bridge of Spies (2015) – Harald Ott
 The Lion Woman (2016) – Johannes Joachim
  (2016, TV film) – Vorsitzender Richter
  (2016) – Dr. Weiss
 The Crown (2017, TV series) – Kurt Hahn
 Das schweigende Klassenzimmer (2018) – Volksbildungsminister Lange
 Brecht (2019) – Bertolt Brecht

Writings

References

Further reading

External links

 
 

1949 births
Living people
German male film actors
German male television actors
Male actors from Berlin
20th-century German male actors
21st-century German male actors
German Film Award winners